The Energy Studies Institute (ESI) is an independent research institute within the National University of Singapore. The ESI's research and analyses focus on the areas of Energy Economics, Energy Security and Energy and the Environment.

References

Energy in Singapore
National University of Singapore
Energy research institutes
Research institutes in Singapore